Brett Goodes (born 17 February 1984) is a former professional Australian rules footballer who played for the  in the Australian Football League (AFL). He is the younger brother of Sydney Swans dual Brownlow Medalist Adam Goodes.

He played for North Ballarat in the Victorian Football League (VFL) and NT Thunder in the Queensland Australian Football League (QAFL) before accepting a job with the Western Bulldogs as a player development manager.  Whilst at the club, he played in the Bulldogs VFL reserves squad, Williamstown. Goodes played 40 games and kicked 27 goals for the VFL Seagulls in 2011 & 2012, including the 2011 VFL grand final loss to Port Melbourne. He finished in third place in the Club best and fairest award in both seasons and was awarded the best player in the finals in 2011.

At the end of the 2012 season, he was invited to train with the Bulldogs senior team, and was selected with the club's first draft pick in the 2013 Rookie Draft.

AFL career
He made his AFL debut for the Bulldogs in the opening round of the 2013 season against  at Etihad Stadium. In the Round 2 match against Fremantle, he was amongst the best players afield. After a promising first year, Goodes struggled for form in the 2014 season, playing predominantly in the club's VFL reserves team, where he won the Best and Fairest.

Goodes was delisted at the conclusion of the 2014 AFL season, but was re-drafted by the Bulldogs in the 2014 rookie draft, and was elevated to the senior list prior to the club's 2015 opening round clash against .

He was delisted at the conclusion of the 2015 AFL season.

Statistics
 Statistics are correct to the end of the 2015 season

|-
|- style="background-color: #EAEAEA"
! scope="row" style="text-align:center" | 2013
|style="text-align:center;"|
| 44 || 13 || 2 || 1 || 169 || 101 || 270 || 66 || 34 || 0.2 || 0.1 || 13.0 || 7.8 || 20.8 || 5.1 || 2.6
|-
! scope="row" style="text-align:center" | 2014
|style="text-align:center;"|
| 44 || 2 || 0 || 0 || 15 || 6 || 21 || 6 || 3 || 0.0 || 0.0 || 7.5 || 3.0 || 10.5 || 3.0 || 1.5
|- style="background-color: #EAEAEA"
! scope="row" style="text-align:center" | 2015
|style="text-align:center;"|
| 44 || 7 || 2 || 1 || 53 || 31 || 84 || 17 || 21 || 0.3 || 0.1 || 7.6 || 4.4 || 12.0 || 2.7 || 3.0
|- class="sortbottom"
! colspan=3| Career
! 22
! 4
! 2
! 237
! 138
! 375
! 89
! 58
! 0.2
! 0.1
! 12.3
! 7.1
! 19.4
! 4.8
! 2.5
|}

References

External links

1984 births
Living people
Australian rules footballers from Victoria (Australia)
Western Bulldogs players
Northern Territory Football Club players
North Ballarat Football Club players
Williamstown Football Club players
Australian people of English descent
Indigenous Australian players of Australian rules football